Alan Brennert (born May 30, 1954 in Englewood, New Jersey) is an American author, television producer, and screenwriter. Brennert has lived in Southern California since 1973 and completed graduate work in screenwriting at the University of California, Los Angeles.

Career

Television
Alan Brennert's earliest television work was in 1978 when he wrote several scripts for the Wonder Woman series. He was story editor for the NBC series Buck Rogers in the 25th Century and wrote seven scripts for that series. He won an Emmy Award as a producer and writer for L.A. Law in 1991. For fans of science fiction and fantasy, he might be best known as a writer for the revival series The Twilight Zone and The Outer Limits. One of his best regarded episodes was for The Twilight Zone, "Her Pilgrim Soul", which became a play. Brennert said that writing "Her Pilgrim Soul" was a deeply cathartic experience which allowed him to get past the death of a woman he had loved. He also wrote two The Twilight Zone teleplays based on stories by Harlan Ellison, who later said that Brennert was the only writer he would ever allow to adapt his works. Since 2001 Brennert has written episodes of the television series Stargate Atlantis and Star Trek: Enterprise under the name of Michael Bryant.

Prose
Brennert also writes short stories and novels. His first story, "City of Masques", was published in 1973. In 1975 he was nominated for the John W. Campbell Award for Best New Writer in Science Fiction. He won a Nebula Award for Best Short Story in 1991 and had stories in Gardner Dozois's Year's Best volumes. His 2003 book Moloka'i is a historical novel that focuses on life in Honolulu and the leper colony at Kalaupapa in Hawaii made famous by Father Damien, Mother Marianne Cope, and Lawrence M. Judd, historical people who appear in the novel set in the early 1900s. It received mostly favorable reviews. The decision to write Moloka'i came after a four-hour miniseries Brennert wrote for NBC was not picked up. According to his website, Brennert wanted to "write something that people would get to see." In 2009, Brennert returned to Hawai'i in Honolulu, a historical novel centering on a Korean picture bride in the early 1900s. The story told in Honolulu came out of Brennert's research from Moloka'i.

Comic books
Brennert's first work in the comics industry was conducting interviews with A. E. van Vogt, Larry Niven, and Theodore Sturgeon which were published in Marvel Comics' Unknown Worlds of Science Fiction  comics magazine. His first comics story was plotting DC Comics' Wonder Woman #231 (May 1977) and #232 (June 1977) which were scripted by Martin Pasko. Brennert and Pasko collaborated again on Star Trek #12 (March 1981) for Marvel. That same month, he and artist Dick Giordano crafted the lead Batman story for Detective Comics #500. This story, "To Kill a Legend", was included in DC's "Year's Best Comics Stories" of 1981 collection. Brennert then wrote four issues of The Brave and the Bold featuring Batman team-ups with the Creeper, the Hawk and Dove, the Robin of Earth Two, and the Catwoman. Editor Dennis O'Neil had him write Daredevil #192 (March 1983), which followed Frank Miller's run on that title. Due to his television schedule, Brennert did not have the time to write any additional comic books for several years. A Deadman story in Christmas with the Super-Heroes #2 (1989) was his next work in the comics industry, followed by a Black Canary tale in Secret Origins vol. 2 #50 (Aug. 1990). He wrote  Batman: Holy Terror, the first DC comic book to feature the Elseworlds logo. His final comics story was a "Batman Black and White" backup feature in Batman: Gotham Knights #10 (Dec. 2000) drawn by José Luis García-López.

In 2014, Brennert "requested equity in the [Barbara Kean Gordon] character and compensation for her use" in the Gotham television series due to having introduced the character in Detective Comics #500. DC Comics and parent company Warner Bros. denied the request claiming that the character was "derivative" of an already existing DC character.

Tales of the Batman: Alan Brennert, a hardcover collection of Brennert's work for DC Comics, was published in 2016. He has named "The Autobiography of Bruce Wayne" from The Brave and the Bold #197 (April 1983) as his personal favorite of his DC stories.

Bibliography

Novels and short story collections
City of Masques (1978) 
Kindred Spirits (1984) 
Time and Chance (1990) 
Her Pilgrim Soul: And Other Stories (1990) 
Moloka'i (2001) 
Honolulu (2009) 
Palisades Park (2013) 
Daughter of Moloka'i (2019)

Comic books

DC Comics
 Batman: Gotham Knights #10 ("Batman Black and White") (2000)
 Batman: Holy Terror (Elseworlds) (1991)
 The Brave and the Bold #178, 181–182, 197 (1981–1983)
 Christmas with the Super-Heroes #2 (Deadman) (1989)
 Detective Comics #500, 600 (1981–1989)
 Secret Origins vol. 2 #50 (Black Canary) (1990)
 Wonder Woman #231–232 (1977)

Marvel Comics
 Daredevil #192 (1983)
 Star Trek #12 (1981)
 Unknown Worlds of Science Fiction #4–5, Special #1 (text articles) (1975–1976)

Television and film
Wonder Woman (1978–1979)
Buck Rogers in the 25th Century (1979–1980)
The Mississippi (1984)
Simon & Simon (1983–1985)
The Twilight Zone (1985–1989)
China Beach (1989)
L.A. Law (1991–1992)
The Outer Limits (1995–1997, 2001)
The Lake (1998)
Odyssey 5 (2002)
Stargate Atlantis (2005)

Awards and nominations

References

External links
Biography from Bookbrowse
 

Official Website

1954 births
20th-century American novelists
20th-century American male writers
21st-century American novelists
21st-century American male writers
American comics writers
American male novelists
American male screenwriters
American science fiction writers
Emmy Award winners
Living people
Nebula Award winners
Novelists from New Jersey
People from Englewood, New Jersey
Screenwriters from California
Screenwriters from New Jersey
UCLA Film School alumni
Television producers from California
Television producers from New Jersey